Tyfaelog was a 6th-century saint of Wales. The saint is connected to a small area near Brecon south Powys where there are two churches: Llandyfaelog Tre'r-graig and Llandyfaelog Fach. There is also a church in Llandyfaelog, between Kidwelly and Carmarthen (Carmarthenshire).

Tyfaelog is recorded as being a son of Gildas.

A feast day is celebrated in his honor on 1 March at Llandyfaelog Tre'r-graig and on 26 February at Llandyfaelog, Ystrad Tywi.

References

Welsh Roman Catholic saints
6th-century Christian saints